David Willis is a Republican member of the North Carolina House of Representatives who has represented the 68th district (including part of Union County) since 2021. He is the house new member leader for the 2021-2022 session.

Committee assignments

2021-2022 session
Appropriations 
Appropriations - Education
K-12 Education (Vice Chair)
Election Law and Campaign Finance Reform Committee
Transportation

Electoral history

References

Living people
Year of birth missing (living people)
People from Waxhaw, North Carolina
Appalachian State University alumni
Republican Party members of the North Carolina House of Representatives
21st-century American politicians